Yellow Earth Theatre is an internationally touring theatre company based in London and established in 1995 to raise the profile of British East Asian theatre. The company also runs several initiatives to support and develop British East Asian talent.

The company has received national attention for its support of minority actors, writers and directors.

The current artistic director is Kumiko Mendl.

In 2011, the company began collaborating with Academy of Live and Recorded Arts to increase the number of East Asians attending drama school in the United Kingdom.

History

The company was founded by David K.S. Tse, Kumiko Mendl, Tom Wu, Veronica Needa and Kwong Loke.

David K.S. Tse was the Artistic Director 1995-2008; Jonathan Man and Philippe Cherbonnier co-Artistic Directors 2009-2010; and Kumiko Mendl the current Artistic Director from 2011–present. In 2017, Mendle spoke out on this issue of under representation of actors with Asian heritage. Self-identifying as British Asian, she stated that there were "a great many wonderful, talented British Asian actors, but we get few enough roles as it is, because we're not seen as English".

Awards

Pearl Award for Creative Endeavour (2004)
Windrush Award (Arts Achievement) to David K.S. Tse, 2004) 
Sainsbury's Checkout Theatre Award for Play to Win.

Past and present productions

New Territories by David K.S. Tse – September 1996
Behind the Chinese Takeaway by Erika Tan & David K.S. Tse – September 1997
The Whisper of a Leaf Falling by Philippe Cherbonnier – September 1998
Blue Remembered Hills by Dennis Potter – September 1999
Play to Win by David K.S. Tse – September 2000
Rashomon adapted by Philippe Cherbonnier – October 2001
Face by Veronica Needa – February 2002 and 2005
Typhoon supported by Soho Theatre and Esmée Fairbairn Foundation – June 2002, 2003, 2004 and 2005
The Butcher's Skin by Luu Quang Vu – September 2002
Lear's Daughters by Elaine Feinstein and The Women's Theatre Group – November 2003
Festival for the Fish by Yu Miri – January 2004 
58 by Philippe Cherbonnier – October 2004
The Nightingale adapted by David K.S. Tse – November 2005
King Lear adapted by David K.S. Tse – November 2006 in the West End and Shanghai
Running the Silk Road by Paul Sirett – May 2008
Boom by Jean Tay – October 2009
wAve by Sung Rno – October 2009
A Dream of Red Pavilions' by Jeremy Tiang – 2010Why the Lion Danced by Carey English – January 2011Dim Sum Nights – November 2011 – November 2012 by Kumiko Mendl, Claire Sumi, Victoria Shepherd and Thanh Le Dang. Performed by Oliver Biles, Matthew Leonhart, Tina Chiang and Louise-Mai Newberry.The Chang Institute'' by Kumiko Mendl, Joseph Davies, Jessica Henwick and Thanh Le Dang- July 2012

References

External links
Yellow Earth theatre website

1995 establishments in England
Arts organizations established in 1995
Theatre companies in London